The Predigtstuhl Cable Car has been in operation since 1928 and is the second oldest (the oldest being the Spanish Aerocar across the Niagara River in Canada), still running, original large-cabin cable car in the world. Since 2006, the ropeway has been placed under the protection of monuments. In 2013 the "Predigstuhlbahn" as well as the hotel and mountain-top restaurant came under new ownership, "Marga und Josef Posch", which belongs to the German businessman group Max Eicher.

History and construction
The cable car began operations on 1 July 1928, after only a year of construction. The production of the cables was assigned to the Westphalian Wire Industry (Westfälische Drahtindustrie). The building of the three pylons, at heights of 22, 32 and 9 metres was contracted to Hochtief AG, from Munich.

The heartpiece, the wire ropeway drive technology and the two elegant pavilion passengers cabins were manufactured by the German, at that time worldwide leading wire ropeways company Adolf Bleichert & Co. from Leipzig, technology based on the Bleichert-Zuegg system.

Technical data
Height of valley station: 474 metres 
Height of mountain station: 1,583 metres
Height difference: 1,140 metres 
Length: 2,380 metres 
Power: 150 PS 
Capacity: 150 persons/hour
Journey time: 8.5 minutes

References

Cable cars in Germany
1928 establishments in Germany